Crystal Elaine Marie Thomas (born January 18, 1994) is an American soccer player who plays for Hibernian in the Scottish Women's Premier League.

Early life 
Thomas grew up in Chicago and graduated from Wheaton Academy in West Chicago. She helped the school claim a state title in 2009 as well as three Class 2A super-sectional and sectional titles (2009–11), and four regional titles (2009–12). As a senior in 2012 she tied a school record, scoring 36 goals, and was an all-state first team selection.

Thomas played club soccer with Chicago Sockers, helping the team win a pair of Illinois state cup titles in 2010 and 2011. She also spent time with the Olympic Development Program Region II team, captaining at both at region and state level.

College 
Thomas began playing college soccer at the University of Notre Dame in 2012. As a freshman, Thomas appeared in all of the Fighting Irish's 24 matches including 19 starts. She scored a team-leading 10 goals as well as registering two assists as Notre Dame claimed the Big East Conference regular season title. At the end of the year she was named to the Big East All-Rookie team and was a Big East second-team selection. After two seasons with Notre Dame, Thomas transferred to Georgetown in 2014. She scored the game-winning overtime goal to beat George Washington in her Hoyas debut but then suffered a torn hamstring and redshirted for the season. After nine months out, Thomas returned to play a further 46 games in the next two seasons, scoring 18 goals and 8 assists, and earned Big East second-team honors both years. She most notably scored the only goal in Georgetown's 1–0 NCAA quarter-final win over Santa Clara to send the Hoyas to their first ever College Cup in 2016.

Club career

Washington Spirit 
Thomas registered for the 2017 NWSL College Draft but was not selected. She signed a professional contract with Washington Spirit in April 2017 having spent preseason on trial with the team. She made her pro debut and only appearance of the 2017 season on April 29 as a 65th-minute substitute during a 1–0 defeat to Houston Dash. On May 19, 2017, Thomas was waived by Washington.

Medkila 
In June 2017, Thomas signed with Norwegian Toppserien team Medkila IL. She made 10 appearances during the 2017 Toppserien season, scoring one goal in a defeat to Kolbotn on October 28 as Medkila finished in last place and were relegated.

Valur 
Thomas moved to Iceland to sign for Valur ahead of the 2018 Úrvalsdeild season. She played in all 18 league games, scoring five goals, and scored another two goals in three Icelandic Cup appearances.

Return to Washington 
After two years in Scandinavia, Thomas returned to the NWSL and re-signed with Washington Spirit on May 23, 2019. During the 2019 season she scored three goals and was named NWSL Player of the Week for week 20 after scoring a goal and an assist in a 3–0 win away at Orlando Pride on October 5.

During the 2019–20 NWSL offseason, Thomas joined Perth Glory for the 2019–20 W-League season.

With the 2020 NWSL season disrupted by the COVID-19 pandemic, the Spirit's schedule was limited to nine games. Thomas featured in one game during the 2020 NWSL Challenge Cup and a further three games during the Fall Series, scoring once, an 88th-minute equalizer in a 1–1 tie with Chicago Red Stars on September 26. She was waived and placed on the offseason re-entry wire as part of the team's end of season roster moves in December 2020.

Orlando Pride 
On February 23, 2021, after a short trial period during preseason, Thomas signed a one-year contract with Orlando Pride. She made her debut on May 1, 2021, as an 82nd-minute substitute for Sydney Leroux in a 0–0 draw with North Carolina Courage in the team's last 2021 NWSL Challenge Cup group game. Thomas' contract expired at the end of the season and she released to the waiver wire.

Hibernian 
On May 4, 2022, Thomas signed with Scottish Women's Premier League team Hibernian ahead of the 2022–23 season.

International career 
Thomas has been called up to training camps for both the United States under-20 and under-23 teams.

Career statistics

Club summary 
.

Honors

College
Notre Dame Fighting Irish
Big East regular season: 2012

Georgetown Hoyas
 Big East Tournament: 2016

References

External links
 Georgetown profile
 

1994 births
American women's soccer players
Living people
Notre Dame Fighting Irish women's soccer players
Georgetown Hoyas women's soccer players
Washington Spirit players
Medkila IL (women) players
Crystal Thomas
Perth Glory FC (A-League Women) players
Orlando Pride players
Hibernian W.F.C. players
United States women's under-20 international soccer players
American expatriate women's soccer players
American expatriate sportspeople in Norway
Expatriate women's footballers in Norway
American expatriate sportspeople in Iceland
Expatriate women's footballers in Iceland
American expatriate sportspeople in Australia
Expatriate women's soccer players in Australia
American expatriate sportspeople in Scotland
Soccer players from Illinois
Sportspeople from Elgin, Illinois
Women's association football forwards
National Women's Soccer League players
Toppserien players
Úrvalsdeild kvenna (football) players
A-League Women players
Scottish Women's Premier League players